Walhallow Station also once known as Walhallow Downs often just referred to as Walhallow is a pastoral lease that operates as a cattle station in the Northern Territory of Australia.

Location
Walhallow shares a boundary to the north with Mallapunyah Station, to the south and east with Cresswell Downs, and to the south and west with Anthony Lagoon.

Description
The station has a carrying capacity of 50,000 head of Brahman cattle. The neighbouring property to the south is Anthony Lagoon.

History
The first Europeans to explore the area, which was Kotandji land , were Ernest Favenc and Nathaniel Buchanan who conducted expeditions around the Barkly Tableland area in 1878.

The property was first settled by John Bassett and William Christian in 1881. Christian was still an owner of the station in 1907 a mob of 1,325 cattle were  droved to Springfield.

Walhallow was sold in 1913 along with all of the plant and stock to Messrs Cumming and Capper.

Very heavy rains fell in 1925 with the station recording  of rain in the first three months of the year. Borroloola on the McArthur River received an equivalent amount.

In 1929 an Aboriginal employee at the station was murdered by two caucasian employees. The aborigine named Paddy had stolen some sweet potatoes from the homestead garden and was confronted by the white-man, William John Everitt. Paddy then attacked Everitt and while they were wrestling the other white-man, William John Faulk, pulled Paddy off and sent him back to camp with a kick. Paddy's body was found later beaten to death. Both Faulk and Everitt were charged with murder and taken to Darwin for trial.

Walhallow was once the headquarters of Peter Sherwin and the Sherwin Pastoral Company and was in his possession in 1987.

The station was purchased by Paraway Pastoral Company, funded by Macquarie Pastoral, in 2009 along with other Georgina Pastoral company and AACo. properties including Clonagh and Davenport Downs. Paraway still owned the property in 2012, under the management of Cameron Fulcher. The property is run in conjunction with Cresswell Downs.

See also
List of ranches and stations
List of the largest stations in Australia

References

Stations (Australian agriculture)
Pastoral leases in the Northern Territory
1881 establishments in Australia